Trichophorum clementis (syn. Scirpus clementis) is a species of flowering plant in the sedge family known by the common name Yosemite bulrush. It is endemic to the Sierra Nevada of California, where it is known from high-elevation mountain meadows and streambanks.

Description
There are a few short, thick, hairlike leaves at the base. At the tip of each stem is the inflorescence, a clublike spikelet less than a centimeter long which is composed of a few tiny flowers.

References

External links
Jepson Manual Treatment
Flora of North America
Photo gallery

clementis
Endemic flora of California
Flora of the Sierra Nevada (United States)
Plants described in 1912
Flora without expected TNC conservation status